The fleshysnout catfish (Arius dispar) is a species of sea catfish in the family Ariidae. It was described by Albert William Herre in 1926, originally under the genus Tachysurus. It is known from tropical brackish and freshwater in Asia, including the Philippines, Taiwan, and possibly Borneo.

The diet of the fleshysnout catfish consists of insects such as dragonfly nymphs, the larvae of midges, insect eggs, as well as snails, microcrustaceans, shrimp, finfish and diatoms.

References

Arius (fish)
Taxa named by Albert William Herre
Fish described in 1926